The cyanonickelates are a class of chemical compound containing anions consisting of nickel atoms, and cyanide groups. The most important of these are the tetracyanonickelates containing four cyanide groups per nickel. The tetracyanonickelates contain the [Ni(CN)4]2− anion. This can exist in solution or in solid salts. The ion has cyanide groups arranged in a square around the central nickel ion. The symmetry of the ion is D4h. The distance from the nickel atom to the carbon is 1.87 Å, and the carbon-nitrogen distance is 1.16 Å. Tetracyanonickelate(II) can be oxidised electrochemically in solution to yield tetracyanonickelate(III) [Ni(CN)4]−. [Ni(CN)4]− is unstable and Ni(III) oxidises the cyanide to cyanate OCN−. Tetracyanonickelate(III) can add two more cyanide groups to form hexacyanonickelate(III).

In combination with alkyldiamines, and other metal ions, tetracyanonickelate ions can form cage structure that can accommodate organic molecules. This is a Hofmann-diam-type clathrate.

If the cation is a very strong reducing agent, such as Yb2+, [Ni(CN)4]2− can be reduced to [Ni2(CN)6]4− where nickel atom is in the +1 oxidation state.

References

Nickel complexes
Cyanometallates